The 2015–16 Oakland Golden Grizzlies men's basketball team represented Oakland University during the 2015–16 NCAA Division I men's basketball season. The Golden Grizzlies were led by 32nd year head coach Greg Kampe and played their home games at the Athletics Center O'rena. They finished the season 23–12, 13–5 in Horizon League play to finish in a tie for second place. They lost in the semifinals of the Horizon League tournament to Wright State. They were invited to the inaugural Vegas 16 where they defeated Towson and East Tennessee State to advance to the championship game where they lost to Old Dominion.

Preseason
The Oakland team traveled to Spain for a week at the end of August. During the trip, they defeated each of the three European professional teams they faced.

Junior point guard Kay Felder was named Horizon League Preseason Player of the Year and Preseason First Team. The vote included coaches, media and sports information directors. Oakland was picked to finish in second place in the league.

Felder was also named to the Lute Olson Award Preseason Watch List. Felder is one of 30 players on the list. The award is given to the "top Division I player who has played at least two seasons."

Season
Oakland finished tied for second in the Horizon League with a 13–5 record. They received the No. 2 seed in the conference tournament and a bye into the semifinals of the tournament where they lost to No. 3 Wright State.

Oakland accepted a bid to the inaugural Vegas 16 tournament where they defeated Towson and East Tennessee State before they lost to Old Dominion 68–67 in the championship game.

After the season, Felder hired an agent and entered the 2016 NBA Draft, ending his college eligibility. Felder is the first Oakland player to leave school early to enter the NBA draft.

Roster

Schedule
The following is Oakland's schedule.

|-
! colspan="9" style="background:#; color:#;"| Non-conference regular season

|-
! colspan="9" style="background:#; color:#;"| Horizon League regular season

|-
! colspan="9" style="background:#; color:#;"|Horizon League tournament

|-
! colspan="9" style="background:#; color:#;"|Vegas 16 tournament

References

External links
 Official site

Oakland Golden Grizzlies men's basketball seasons
Oakland
Oakland Golden Grizzlies men's basketball
Oakland Golden Grizzlies men's basketball
Oakland